Joy Onaolapo (24 December 1982 in Sapele, Nigeria – July 2013) was a Nigerian champion Paralympic weightlifter (2012). She won the gold medal in the 52 kg powerlifting category at the 2012 London games.

Onaolapo was confirmed dead in July 2013 at the age of 30. Nigerian former President Goodluck Ebele Jonathan described "the death of the Nigerian Paralympian gold medallist, Mrs. Joy Onaolapo as a big loss to the nation." Coach Ijeoma Iheriobim, "has described late Onaolapo as a committed and diligent athlete."

References

External links 
 

1982 births
2013 deaths
Nigerian female weightlifters
Powerlifters at the 2012 Summer Paralympics
Medalists at the 2012 Summer Paralympics
Paralympic gold medalists for Nigeria
Paralympic medalists in powerlifting
Paralympic powerlifters of Nigeria
Nigerian powerlifters
20th-century Nigerian women
21st-century Nigerian women